National Taiwan Normal University (NTNU), or Shīdà  is an institution of higher education and normal school operating out of three campuses in Taipei, Taiwan. NTNU is the leading research institute in such disciplines as Education,  Linguistics, Fine Arts, Music and Sports in Taiwan. NTNU enjoys a long and distinguished history as one of the four oldest universities in Taiwan. Founded in 1922 during the Japanese regime, it was first known as Taihoku High School  under the Government-General of Taiwan before being renamed as Taiwan Provincial Teachers College in 1946, and subsequently restructured as a comprehensive university in 1994.

NTNU is widely recognized as one of Taiwan's comprehensive and elite higher education institutions with the most international exposure. NTNU is affiliated with National Taiwan University and National Taiwan University of Science and Technology as part of the National Taiwan University System. NTNU is an official member of International Consortium for Universities of Education in East Asia (ICUE), University Alliance in Talent Education Development (UAiTED), and AAPBS. NTNU selected as one of four landmark bilingual universities in Taiwan. A number of Taiwan's leading artists, authors, educators, musicologists, linguists, painters, philologists, poets, sinologists and many researchers have passed through the university's doors as students and faculty.

The university enrolls approximately 17,000 students each year. Approximately 1,500 students are international.

Since 2015, NTNU has been ranked within 350 in the QS World University Rankings (No. 331 in the world in 2020 and No. 61 in Asia). NTNU has been ranked among the top 50 in the world in the three disciplines of education, linguistics, and library and information management systems.

The affiliated senior high school of National Taiwan Normal University is also one of the top high schools in Taiwan. NTNU's dynamically evolving Mandarin Teaching Centre is a prime site for the study of Chinese language, attracting thousands of students from around the world.

History 

National Taiwan Normal University opened its doors in the early 20th century during Japanese rule in Taiwan. Taiwan's Japanese governors established the school as Taiwan Provincial College. Soon after they gave it the name Taihoku College (Taihoku is "Taipei" in Japanese). The school's purpose was to nurture a native educated class qualified to assist the government in matters of administration. Many buildings on the university's main campus date from the Japanese colonial period, including the Administration Building, the Lecture Hall, Wenhui Hall and Puzi Hall. Japanese architects incorporated features of the Neo-Classical, Gothic and Gothic Revival styles often encountered on European university campuses. A room in the Lecture Hall housed the traditional Japanese document that authorizes and formalizes campus construction.

Some school publications still display 1946 as the institution's founding date in reference to this regime change. A number of Taiwan's leading authors, poets, artists, educators, painters, musicians, linguists, sinologists, philologists, philosophers, and researchers have passed through the university's doors as students and faculty. In 1956 the Mandarin Training Center opened its doors as an extension of the college. The school acquired its present name, National Taiwan Normal University, in 1967. By now the school had established itself as a recognized center of learning in arts, literature and the humanities; its fundamental mission, though, remained the preparation of teachers.

As Taiwanese society made its shift from authoritarian rule to democracy in the 1990s, the university saw its role transformed by passage of the 1994 Teacher Preparation Law. The law gave more schools responsibility for teacher training and set NTNU on its present course as a truly comprehensive university. New departments were created, course offerings and majors were expanded, and new faculty were hired. The university became a hub of international activity, enabling Taiwanese students to travel abroad, attracting international students to Taipei, and building exchange programs with dozens of sister institutions around the world.

University structure 

NTNU occupies three campuses in downtown Taipei: the historic Daan campus/main campus (home of the Administration Building, Main Library, Music & Lecture Hall, Language Building, Athletic Center); the Gongguan campus (home of the College of Science); the Linkou campus and the university library campus hosting the school of continuing education. Academic programs at NTNU are administered by 10 colleges: arts, education, international studies & social sciences, liberal arts, management, musicology, science, sports & recreation, and technology & engineering.

As of November 2022 the school published the following figures for students enrolled and employees retained.
 Students enrolled: 15,112
 Undergraduate students: 8,394 (944 international students)
 Graduate students: 5,686 (682 international students)
 Overseas Chinese Students in Preparatory Programs: 1,032
 Faculty: 1,541

The university also runs the Affiliated Senior High School of National Taiwan Normal University, a daughter institution for secondary-school students in Taiwan.

International programs 

Internationally NTNU is best known for its Mandarin Training Center (formerly known as the Center for Chinese Language and Cultural Studies), a program founded in 1956 for the study of Mandarin Chinese to foreign students. The Mandarin Training Center represents one of the world's oldest and most distinguished programs for language study, attracting more than a thousand students from over sixty countries to Taiwan each year and making the Shida area of Taipei one of the city's most cosmopolitan. Courses in language, literature, calligraphy, art and martial arts are offered in a series of three-month terms throughout the year, enabling international students to undertake language studies during summer breaks and within single semesters. The center also sponsors travel, hosts speech contests, and stages workshops and performances for a variety of East Asian arts. A Mandarin Training Center Alumni Association (MTCAA) has been operating since 1998.

Other international highlights recently at NTNU include the International Chemistry Olympiad hosted by the university in 2005 and the merger of NTNU with the University Preparatory School for Overseas Chinese Students in 2006. NTNU also participates in the Biodiversity Program of the Taiwan International Graduate Program of Academia Sinica. A new dormitory for NTNU international students is slated to open in 2024.

NTNU nurtures a robust system of partnerships to enable this level of international study. Among the institutions that enjoy sister relationships with NTNU are the University of Pennsylvania, Columbia University, Johns Hopkins University, University of California, Los Angeles, University of California San Diego, University of California, Irvine, University of Illinois Urbana-Champaign, University of Texas at Austin, University of Wisconsin-Madison, Ohio State University, University of Maryland, College Park, and Rutgers University in the US, the University College London, King’s College, University of London, University of Manchester, University of Glasgow and University of Birmingham in the UK, the University of British Columbia, University of Alberta and Simon Fraser University in Canada, the Australian National University, and Monash University in Australia, the École normale supérieure de Lyon, Sciences Po and Aix-Marseille University in France, University of Heidelberg, Free University of Berlin and University of Bonn in Germany, the Seoul National University, Korea University and Yonsei University in South Korea, Kyushu University, Osaka University, Hokkaido University, Nagoya University, Tohoku University, University of Tsukuba and Waseda University in Japan, Nanyang Technological University, Singapore Management University in Singapore,University of Hong Kong, Chinese University of Hong Kong, Hong Kong University of Science and Technology, Hong Kong Polytechnic University and City University of Hong Kong in HK, University of Auckland and University of Otago in New Zealand, University of Helsinki and University of Turku in Finland, Lund University and Uppsala University in Sweden, Leiden University and RSM Erasmus University in the Netherlands, Universidade de São Paulo in Brazil, University of Johannesburg in South Africa. NTNU's connections in the Asia-Pacific region are particularly extensive, including dozens of academic institutions representing South Korea, Japan, Singapore, Thailand, Australia, and New Zealand.

NTNU signed the Taiwan Huayu BEST Program partnership with Pennsylvania State University, University of California, Santa Barbara, University of California, Los Angeles, University of Maryland, and University of Guam.

Ranking

 U.S. News & World Report Best Global Universities subject rankings:

Education and Educational Research: 9th (Asia's second)

 Times Higher Education World University Rankings by subject: 

Education: 15 (Asia's second)

 QS World University Rankings by Subject: 

Education & Training: 26

Library & Information Management: 30

Linguistics: 53

Sports-Related Subjects: 51-100

Performing Arts: 101-115

Modern Languages: 101-150
 Academic Ranking of World Universities (ARWU) of Academic Subjects:

Education: 51-75 (Asia's third)

 Global Views Monthly Taiwan's Best University Rankings:

Universities focusing on humanities and social sciences: 1st

List of NTNU People

Notable faculty 
Apo Hsu (Hsu Ching-Hsin 許瀞心) – conductor
Chen Daqi – a polymath, politician and pioneer of modern psychology in China
Chen Houei-kuen – painter
Cornelius C. (Neil) Kubler – American professor and scholar of Mandarin, Taiwanese and other dialects of Chinese; former U.S. diplomat
Kuo-En Chang – a computer education scholar, 13th president of the National Taiwan Normal University
Howard S.H. Shyr – a law scholar and politician
Hu Qiuyuan – an author, educator and politician.
Lee Shih-chiao – painter
Lee Tze-Fan – painter
Liang Shih-chiu –  the first Chinese scholar to single-handedly translate the complete works of Shakespeare into Chinese
Li Meishu – Zushi Temple designer
Lin Yu-shan – painter
Lo, Kii-Ming – musicologist
Mou Zongsan – Chinese New Confucian philosopher
Puru – artist, calligrapher, and member of the Qing dynasty ruling Aisin Gioro family and grandson of the Daoguang Emperor
Shan-Hua Chien – musicologist
Su Xuelin – Chinese author and writer
Tyzen Hsiao – composer of the neo-Romantic school
Wen-Pin Hope Lee – Taiwanese Golden Melody Award-winning composer
Xie Bingying – a female soldier and writer born in Loudi, Hunan
Yeh Shin-cheng – an environment scholar and politician
Yu Guangzhong – a writer, poet, educator, and critic

Notable alumni 
Ang Ui-jin – Taiwanese linguist.  He was the chief architect of the Taiwanese Language Phonetic Alphabet
Chang Chun-Yen – Taiwanese science education scholar
Chen Hung-ling – Taiwanese badminton player
Chen Kuei-miao – Taiwanese politician
Cheng Shao-chieh – Taiwanese badminton player
Chi Shu-ju – Taekwondo practitioner and Olympic medalist
Chien Yu-chin – Chinese Taipei badminton player
Chih-Ta Chia – Taiwanese science scholar
Chong Yee-Voon – Malaysian writer
Chuang Chi-fa – Taiwanese historian
C.-T. James Huang – (PhD 1982) generative linguist, Professor and Director of Graduate Studies at Harvard, Fellow of the Linguistic Society of America (2015), recipient of the Linguistic Society of Taiwan's Lifetime Achievement Award (2014)
Den-Wu Chen – Taiwanese historian, the former chairman of the Department of History at National Taiwan Normal University
Evan Yo – Taiwanese Mandopop singer
Fan-Long Ko – Taiwanese composer
Gong Hwang-cherng – Taiwanese linguist
Han Hsiang-ning – Chinese American artist
Hsieh Chang-heng – Baseball player in the CPBL
Hsu Shui-teh – Taiwanese politician
Huang Kun-huei – Chairman of Taiwan Solidarity Union
Huang Min-hui – Vice Chairperson of Kuomintang, former Mayor of Chiayi City
Jackson T.-S. Sun – Taiwanese linguist
Ku Chin-shui –  Taiwanese aboriginal athlete
Le Chien-Ying – Taiwanese archer
Lee Chu-feng – Kinmen's politician
Li Hsing – Taiwanese film director
Lin Jeng-yi – Director of National Palace Museum
Lin Mun-lee – Taiwanese art scholar
Shara Lin – Taiwanese actress
Tung-Tai Lin –  a professor at the Graduate Institute of Mass Communication at National Taiwan Normal University.
Man-houng Lin – Taiwanese historian, the first woman president of the Academia Historica
Liu Yong – Taiwanese painter and essayist
Lorene Ren – Taiwanese actress
Lu Yen-hsun – Taiwanese professional tennis player
Ma Sen – Taiwanese writer
Paul Jen-kuei Li – Taiwanese linguist
Peng Wan-ru – Taiwanese feminist
Selina Jen – member of the Taiwanese girl group S.H.E
Su I-Chieh – Taiwanese professional basketball player
Tien Lei – Basketball player
Tseng Shu-o – Professional Soccer player in Australia
Uğur Rıfat Karlova – Turkish stand-up comedian
Wai-lim Yip – Hong Kong and Taiwanese poet
Wang Tuoh – Former Secretary-General of Democratic Progressive Party
Wang Jin-pyng – President of the Legislative Yuan
Wilbur Lin, conductor of the Missouri Symphony
Wong Chin-chu – Former Magistrate of Changhua County, former Minister of Council for Cultural Affairs
Wu Ching-ji – Taiwanese educator
Cheng-Chih Wu – Taiwanese computer science education scholar, currently the vice president of the National Taiwan Normal University
Xi Murong – Taiwanese poet and painter
Yang Chih-liang – Taiwanese politician
Yuan Shu-chi – Taiwanese archer

Mandarin Training Center alumni 
Richard Bernstein – American journalist
March Fong Eu – American politician
Andrew Fastow – former CFO of Enron
Howard Goldblatt – American literary translator
Imre Hamar – Hungarian scholar of Chinese studies
Ryutaro Hashimoto – former Prime Minister of Japan
Jon Huntsman, Jr. – former United States Ambassador to Singapore from 1992 to 1993, and China from 2009 to 2011; current U.S. Ambassador to Russia
Koichi Kato – former government minister of Japan
Pierre Ryckmans – Belgian-Australian writer, essayist and sinologist
Kevin Rudd – former Prime Minister of Australia
Chie Tanaka – Japanese model and actress
Richard Vuylsteke – President of the American Chamber of Commerce in Hong Kong
Stephen H. West – American sinologist

Nomenclature 
The standard abbreviated reference to National Taiwan Normal University in English is the acronym NTNU. The standard abbreviated form in Mandarin Chinese is the portmanteau Shi1da4. Romanized as "Shida", this form appears transliterated in place names associated with the campus: Shida Road, Shida Night Market, Shida Bookstore, and the like.

The word normal in the school's name perpetuates an English usage of the term that, if archaic in some countries, remains common in Asia. A "normal school" trains future teachers in educational norms.

MTC is the standard acronym for the Mandarin Training Center.

See also 
 Affiliated Senior High School of National Taiwan Normal University
 Mandarin Training Center

References

External links 

 National Taiwan Normal University official website 

 
Educational institutions established in 1922
Universities and colleges in Taipei
Teachers colleges
1922 establishments in Taiwan
Universities and colleges in Taiwan
Technical universities and colleges in Taiwan